Fly All Ways is an airline of Suriname, based in Paramaribo and started operations on January 10, 2016 with the launch of its inaugural flight above Suriname. Its first commercial flight took place on January 22, 2016 to São Luís, capital of the state of Maranhão in Brazil. On February 5, 2016 this was followed by the first charter flight to Barbados. Later in February 2016 first flights followed to Willemstad, Curaçao and Philipsburg, Sint Maarten. In the same month Guyana granted the new airline rights to operate scheduled flights to Guyana with connections to Brazil and the Caribbean. Fly All Ways is planning to fly to several cities in both the Caribbean and South America.

Fleet acquisition  
Blue Wing Airlines, another Suriname-based aviation company, entered into a sales agreement with KLM Royal Dutch Airlines to acquire two ex-KLM cityhopper Fokker 70 twin jets early January 2014. The airline from Suriname took delivery of PH-KZV (msn 11556) and PH-WXA (11570) in 2014. KLM Cityhopper Fokker 70 PH-KZV was withdrawn from service at Norwich on January 5, 2014 after arriving as KL1515 from Amsterdam, KLM Cityhopper Fokker 70 PH-WXA was withdrawn from service at Amsterdam in the morning of March 30, 2014 after arriving as KL1486 from Humberside. The aircraft then positioned Amsterdam – Norwich for maintenance early the same afternoon as KL9955 where both aircraft were being prepared for service. The aircraft have subsequently been sold to Fly All Ways, by then a new independent start up airline offering transport to regional destinations. On November 20, 2014 the first aircraft (PH-WXA) landed at the Johan Adolf Pengel International Airport of Suriname in Fly All Ways colours. One month later the second Fly All Ways aircraft (PH-KZV) arrived in Suriname. These two are now registered as PZ-TFA & PZ-TFB in Suriname and stationed at the Johan Adolf Pengel International Airport where a new hangar was built.

Transition from Regular schedule to charter  
The airline which was mainly flying between Suriname, Guyana and Barbados suspending its regular flights to reschedule its operations. Although the Suriname base airlines suspend regular flights on January 15, 2017 charter flights are still available, the airline CEO also said it plans to base the airline in Guyana. However, a confirmed time has not yet been set to restart regular service.

Destinations

Fleet 

The Fly All Ways fleet consists of the following aircraft as of June 2022:

References

External links 

Airlines established in 2014
Airlines of Suriname
Companies of Suriname